The 1999–2000 NBA season was the Warriors' 54th season in the National Basketball Association, and 38th in the San Francisco Bay Area. The city of Oakland hosted the 2000 NBA All-Star Game. During the off-season, the Warriors acquired Mookie Blaylock from the Atlanta Hawks, and rookie guard Vonteego Cummings from the Indiana Pacers. The Warriors struggled losing 16 of their first 18 games as head coach P. J. Carlesimo was fired after a 6–21 start, and was replaced with General Manager Garry St. Jean, where the team suffered a 12-game losing streak between December and January. Second-year star Antawn Jamison, Chris Mills, Erick Dampier and Terry Cummings all missed large parts of the season due to injuries. At midseason, the Warriors traded John Starks to the Chicago Bulls, and acquired second-year guard Larry Hughes, and former Warriors forward Billy Owens from the Philadelphia 76ers in a three-team trade. The Warriors lost 23 of their final 26 games, and finished sixth in the Pacific Division with a 19–63 record.

Jamison showed improvement averaging 19.6 points and 8.3 rebounds per game, and was invited to the Slam Dunk Contest during the All-Star Weekend, but did not participate due to a knee injury, and was out for the remainder of the season after 43 games. In addition, Donyell Marshall averaged 14.2 points and 10.0 rebounds per game, while Mills provided the team with 16.1 points and 6.2 rebounds per game in only just 20 games, Jason Caffey provided with 12.0 points and 6.8 rebounds per game, Blaylock contributed 11.3 points, 6.7 assists and 2.0 steals per game, and Vonteego Cummings contributed 9.4 points and 3.3 assists per game off the bench. On the defensive side, Dampier averaged 8.0 points and 6.4 rebounds per game in only just 21 games, while Terry Cummings contributed 8.4 points and 4.9 rebounds per game in only just 22 games, and Adonal Foyle provided with 5.5 points, 5.6 rebounds and 1.8 blocks per game.

Following the season, Marshall was traded to the Utah Jazz in an off-season four-team trade, while Caffey and Owens were both dealt to the Milwaukee Bucks, Terry Cummings retired, and St. Jean was fired as head coach.

Offseason

Draft picks

Roster

Regular season

Season standings

z - clinched division title
y - clinched division title
x - clinched playoff spot

Record vs. opponents

Player statistics

Awards and records

Transactions

Trades

Free agents

Player Transactions Citation:

References

Golden State Warriors seasons
Golden State
Golden
Golden